Verdea may refer to

Places
 Verdea, a village in Sutești Commune, Vâlcea County, Romania
 Verdea, a village in Răcoasa Commune, Vrancea County, Romania

Wine grapes
Verdea (grape), a white Italian wine grape from Lombardy
Verdeca, an Italian wine grape also known as Verdea
Verdesse, another Italian wine grape also known as Verdea
Vernaccia, an Italian wine grape that is also known as Verdea d'Arcetri

Rivers
 A tributary of the Șușița in Vrancea County, Romania
 A tributary of the Săraz in Timiș County, Romania